Antun Nalis (9 February 1911 – 14 February 2000), a.k.a. Tonči Nalis, was a Croatian actor.

Antun Nalis was born in Zadar, which was part of Austria-Hungary at the time. After World War I Zadar became part of Italy, which later helped Nalis to play in Italian movies and portray Italian characters.

Nalis began to build his film career after World War Two. His first screen appearance in 1949 film Zastava almost became his last. In the film he played an Ustasha colonel and in the break between shooting he went to the store to buy groceries, forgetting to change his clothes. He was arrested by UDBA and it took some time to convince authorities that he was an actor playing Ustasha rather than actual Ustasha hiding in the woods after the war.

Not discouraged by the incident, Nalis continued with his career, appearing in many classics of 1950s and 1960s Croatian and Yugoslav cinema. After playing villains in his early career, in this period Nalis established himself in comedic roles in both film and television. Gradually he built a reputation as one of the most recognisable and dependable character actors.

Selected filmography

 Zastava (1949) - Ustaski satnik Vuksan
 The Blue 9 (1950) - Fabris
 U oluji (1952) - Vincenco
 Sinji galeb (1953) - Lorenco
 Stone Horizons (1953) - Martin
 Koncert (1954) - Natporucnik
 Blodveien (1955) - Svare
 The Jubilee of Mr Ikel (1955) - Teodor Ikl
 Mala Jole (1955)
 Zle pare (1956) - Konte
 H-8... (1958) - Ivica - Thief
 Hvězda jede na jih (1959) - Festival director
 Agi Murad il diavolo bianco (1959) - Melders, Murad's Lieutenant
 Campo Mamula (1959) - Talijanski zapovjednik Manipolo
 Vetar je stao pred zoru (1959) - Nemacki major
 Austerlitz (1960) - (uncredited)
 Garibaldi (1961)
 Martin in the Clouds (1961) - Carmine
 The Emperor's New Clothes (1961) - Kapetan straze
 Adventurer at the Door (1961) - Oficir
 Happiness Comes at Nine o'Clock (1961) - Gradjanin
 Velika turneja (1961) - Vodja dramske grupe Tonci
 Karolina Rijecka (1961) - Andra
 Srescemo se veceras (1962) - Gradjanin
 Zvizduk u osam (1962) - Filmski reditelj
 Treasure of the Silver Lake (1962) - Bruns (uncredited)
 Double Circle (1963) - Kuhar
 Apache Gold (1963) - Barman Hicks
 Sluzbeni polozaj (1964) - Cinovnik u administraciji
 Last of the Renegades (1964) - Sgt. Wagner (uncredited)
 Nikoletina Bursać (1964) - Zarobljeni domobran
 Prometheus of the Island (1964) - Elektricar
 Treasure of the Aztecs (1965)
 The Pyramid of the Sun God (1965) - Cortejo
 Čovik od svita (1965) - Krcmar Grgo
 The Oil Prince (1965) - Jenkins (uncredited)
 Denovi na iskusenie (1965) - Oficer predavnik (uncredited)
 Eagles Fly Early (1966) - Nemacki oficir (uncredited)
 Looking Into the Eyes of the Sun (1966) - Vemic
 The Seventh Continent (1966) - Otac djece
 Glineni golub (1966) - Zeljeznicar Martic
 Die Nibelungen (1966, part 1) - Person (uncredited)
 Kaya (1967) - Gradski uglednik Tonko
 Fast ein Held (1967)
 Goli čovik (1968) - Toni
 When You Hear the Bells (1969) - Charles / Topnik
 Sunday (1969) - Imbecil
 Togetherness (1970) - Papalopolous
 Družba Pere Kvržice (1970) - Velecasni
 The Way to Paradise (1970) - Lijecnik, kirurg
 Prvi splitski odred (1972) - Policajac
 Deveto cudo na istoku (1972) - Talijan sa povezom preko oka
 Crveni udar (1974) - Ustasa
 Train in the Snow (1976) - Urednik novina
 Occupation in 26 Pictures (1978) - Paolo
 Covjek koga treba ubiti (1979)
 High Voltage (1981) - Konobar
 Pad Italije (1981)
 The Secret of an Old Attic (1984) - Tonci
 The Red and the Black (1985) - Profasista
 My Uncle's Legacy (1988) - Drug na Martinovom sprovodu
 Captain America (1990) - Old Repairman
 Prica iz Hrvatske (1991) - (final film role)

References

External links

1911 births
2000 deaths
Croatian male actors
Actors from Zadar
People from the Kingdom of Dalmatia
Vladimir Nazor Award winners
20th-century Croatian male actors
Golden Arena winners